Vignolo is a comune (municipality) in the Province of Cuneo in the Italian region Piedmont, located about  south of Turin and about  southwest of Cuneo.

Vignolo borders the following municipalities: Borgo San Dalmazzo, Cervasca, Cuneo, and Roccasparvera.

Demographic evolution

References

Cities and towns in Piedmont